Pogonocherus penicillatus is a species of beetle in the family Cerambycidae. It was described by John Eatton Le Conte in Agassizz in 1850. It is known from Canada and the United States.

References

Pogonocherini
Beetles described in 1850